Super radiant emission or spontaneous coherent emission, is an emitted radiation with constant wave direction and rate that occurs in Fourier function. It is emitted when all electrons radiate in phase with each other, which generates the coherent radiation (super-radiant emission). It is emitted in a quantum mechanical system during a transition between two energy levels of molecules in a gas of dimension small compared to a wavelength.

Theory
Assuming 

  is the propagating mode amplitude.
  describes the interaction of the i-th electron with the electromagnetic field along its path of motion.
  is the imaginary unit.

where the electron-field excitation "transfer function" is defined by

  is the normalization power of the propagating mode .
  is axial velocity.
  is the transverse profile(Hermite-Gaussian free-space mode or wavelength mode).
  is the angular frequency domain.

Solution of the mode amplitude together with equation of motion

  is the mass of the particle.
  is the super-radiant emission.
  is the electromagnetic field in terms of eigenmodes of the medium which the radiation is excited.
  is the instantaneous velocity.
  is the magnetic field in terms of eigenmodes of the medium which the radiation is excited.

enables one to calculate spontaneous and super-radiant emissions, including stimulated interaction resulting in amplification of the excited radiation as occurring in self-amplified spontaneous emission (SASE).

Instruments
Instruments that uses the super radiant emission.
 Free Electron Laser (FEL)
 Far Infrared (FIR) Laser  
 Undulator allows to obtain the super radiant emission.

Application
Superradiant emission using instruments such as FEL are used in materials science, chemical technology and surface analysis. Using the superradiant emission from the instruments, proteins molecules can be imaged. Another use of these instruments in the analysis is the vibrational energy transfer in molecule. High power from superradiant emission allows exciting molecule easier which also makes it easier to analyze the vibrational energy.

Superradiant emission using instruments are very advantageous because they produce high power laser due to coherent radiation and they do not use expensive photons.

Discovery

Superradiance was discovered by American physicist named Robert H. Dicke. He discovered that coherent emission enhances the radiation. In the analytical instruments, superradiance is used to enhance the radiation emitted by the electron.

References

Lasers